Alamgir Kumkum was a Bangladeshi filmmaker, producer and director.

Career
In 1968, Alamgir Kumkum came to the Bengali film industry as an Assistant Director with his uncle ER Khan. His first directed film was "Chena Ochena". Then he also worked as assistant director of the film "Rupabener Rupkataha" and "Madhubala". In 1969, Alamgir Kumkum debuted as a film director. His notable films are Smitituku Thak, Amar Jonmovumi, Gunda, Mayer Doa। His last directed film was Jibon Chabi.।

Filmography

 Smrituku Thak
 Amar Jonmovumi
 Gunda
 Momota
 Aguner Alo
 Kapurush  
 Sonar Cheye Dami
 Rajbondi
 Bhalobasha
 Rajar Raja
 Kabin
 Shamsher
 Roki
 Mayer Doa
 Amor Sangi
 Jibon Chabi

References

External links
 

1942 births
2012 deaths
Bangladeshi film directors
Bangladeshi film producers
People from Dhaka